The Good Reputation (French: La bonne réputation, German: Der gute Ruf) is a 1926 French-German silent drama film directed by Pierre Marodon and starring Lotte Neumann, Hans Mierendorff and Germaine Rouer.

The film's sets were designed by Willi Herrmann.

Cast
 Lotte Neumann as Marguerite de Tanna  
 Hans Mierendorff 
 Germaine Rouer as Thérèse Walcourt  
 Henri Baudin as Le baron de Tanna  
 Olga Engl 
 Olga Limburg
 Jakob Tiedtke 
 Eduard von Winterstein 
 Léon Bary as Max de Termonde  
 Régine Bouet
 Rudolf Lettinger 
 Traute Tinius 
 Alfred Haase 
 Georg H. Schnell 
 Sascha Bragowa 
 Sophie Pagay 
 Wilhelm Chandron 
 Robert Leffler 
 Gustav Adolf Semler
 Maria Forescu

References

Bibliography
 Grange, William. Cultural Chronicle of the Weimar Republic. Scarecrow Press, 2008.

External links

1926 films
Films of the Weimar Republic
German silent feature films
Films directed by Pierre Marodon
1926 drama films
German drama films
French silent feature films
French drama films
German films based on plays
French films based on plays
Films based on works by Hermann Sudermann
UFA GmbH films
German black-and-white films
Silent drama films
1920s French films
1920s German films